Maurice of Saxe-Lauenburg (1551 – 2 November 1612, Buxtehude) was the fourth son of Francis I of Saxe-Lauenburg and Sybille of Saxe-Freiberg (Freiberg, *2 May 1515 – 18 July 1592*, Buxtehude), daughter of Duke Henry IV the Pious of Saxony. Maurice ruled Saxe-Lauenburg as duke between 1581 and 1612, together with his elder brothers Magnus II (until 1588) and Francis II, who survived him.

Life
When in 1571 their father Francis I resigned in favour of his then major sons Magnus II and Francis II, Magnus violently tried to repress his younger brother Francis II, however, failing in the end in 1574. Francis I then reascended the throne. 

After their father's death in 1581 the then major Maurice and his elder brothers Magnus II and Francis II jointly ruled as dukes in Saxe-Lauenburg. However, in 1588 Francis II and Maurice imprisoned Magnus II in Ratzeburg's castle for his repeated atrocities and continued their joint rule without him.

In 1588 his mother played a prominent role in his affair with Gisela von Tschammer, against whom she initiated a trial witchcraft. As duke Maurice remained passive and lived in the abbot's house until his death. The abbot's house now serves as a gallery and café. His mother Sibylle died in Buxtehude in 1592.

Marriage and issue
In 1581 Maurice married Katharina von Spörck; however, they got a divorce already in the next year. They had no children. 

With his mistress Gisela of Saxony (married with Adam von Tschammer) Duke Maurice had two illegitimate sons: 
 Moritz Rautenstein (*? – 1617/39*)
 Julius Ernst Rautenstein (*ca. 1590 – ca. 1660*)

Ancestry

Succession box

 

|-

1551 births
1612 deaths
Maurice
Maurice